Rajan Vichare (born 1 August 1961) is an Indian politician and a Shiv Sena(Uddhav Balasaheb Thackeray) member of parliament representing Thane, Maharashtra in the 17th Lok Sabha (lower house of the Indian Parliament). He has also previously been a member of the Maharashtra Legislative Assembly in 2009-2014.

Early life and career
Vichare has been in association with Shiv Sena since his childhood. Coming from a middle-class family and having worked in various blue-collar jobs, in 1985, he became a full-time worker of Sena. He is an admirer of politician Anand Dighe. Though he was chosen to contest 2014 lok sabha elections from Thane.

Terms in Office 
 2006: Mayor of Thane Municipal Corporation
 2009: Elected to Maharashtra Legislative Assembly
 2014: Elected to Lok Sabha (1st Term) 
 2019: Re-Elected to Lok Sabha (2nd Term)

See also
 Thane Vidhan Sabha constituency

References

External links
 Shiv Sena official website 
 Official Website
Lokasbha Website profile page as MP

Shiv Sena politicians
Maharashtra MLAs 2009–2014
Marathi politicians
People from Thane
Living people
India MPs 2014–2019
Mayors of Thane
Lok Sabha members from Maharashtra
Maharashtra municipal councillors
Politics of Thane district
Politicians from Thane
1961 births
India MPs 2019–present